The Senior men's race at the 2006 IAAF World Cross Country Championships was held at the Umi-no-nakamichi Seaside Park in Fukuoka, Japan, on April 2, 2006.  Reports of the event were given in The New York Times, and for the IAAF.

Complete results for individuals, for teams, medallists, and the results of British athletes who took part were published.

Race results

Senior men's race (12 km)

Individual

Teams

Note: Athletes in parentheses did not score for the team result.

Participation
According to an unofficial count, 140 athletes from 40 countries participated in the Senior men's race.  

 (6)
 (1)
 (4)
 (4)
 (4)
 (5)
 (4)
 (6)
 (1)
 (1)
 (1)
 (4)
 (5)
 (6)
 (2)
 (3)
 (1)
 (1)
 (1)
 (1)
 (6)
 (4)
 (6)
 (1)
 (6)
 (4)
 (6)
 (6)
 (5)
 (5)
 (1)
 (2)
 (4)
 (3)
 (1)
 (1)
 (6)
 (5)
 (6)
 (1)

See also
 2006 IAAF World Cross Country Championships – Men's short race
 2006 IAAF World Cross Country Championships – Junior men's race
 2006 IAAF World Cross Country Championships – Senior women's race
 2006 IAAF World Cross Country Championships – Women's short race
 2006 IAAF World Cross Country Championships – Junior women's race

References

Senior men's race at the World Athletics Cross Country Championships
IAAF World Cross Country Championships